The Last Rose of Summer is a British silent motion picture of 1920 directed by Albert Ward, produced by G. B. Samuelson, and starring Owen Nares and Daisy Burrell. A drama, it was written by Roland Pertwee, based on a novel by Hugh Conway.

Plot
In The Last Rose of Summer Oliver Selwyn is a collector who woos Lotus Devine, but not for herself alone. The movie has been called "a melodramatic tale of a spinster betrayed for the sake of a valuable teaset". Denis Gifford says "Collector feigns love for spinster to obtain her father’s tea service."

Cast
 
 Daisy Burrell as Lotus Devine
 Owen Nares as Oliver Selwyn
 Minna Grey as Amy Palliser
 Tom Reynolds as Palliser
 Richard Barry as Alf Purvis
 John Phelps as Percy Melville

Notes

External links

1920 films
British silent feature films
1920s English-language films
Films set in England
British drama films
1920 drama films
Films directed by Albert Ward
British black-and-white films
Silent drama films
1920s British films